The Real War franchise was a series of real-time tactics video games developed by Rival Interactive and published by Simon & Schuster Interactive.

In-game briefing voices were provided by R. Lee Ermey.

Game series
There were several games in the series, including:

 Joint Forces Employment - The original game that Real War was created from. It was never released outside of the United States military. Released on May 17, 2000. The game was, apart from differences in interface and unit statistics for balancing, (For example, the MLRS units in JFE have much longer range than in Real War) virtually identical to the Real War games released for civilian market.
 Real War (video game)
 Real War: Rogue States (2002)

Reception
In Spain, the 2001 Real War game received a "Gold" prize from the Asociación Española de Distribuidores y Editores de Software de Entretenimiento, for 40,000 sales in the country during its first year.

References

External links

  War games: Military training goes high-tech at CNN.com (Working link)

Video game franchises
Real-time tactics video games
Simon & Schuster Interactive games
Napoleonic Wars video games
Windows games